The Radioactive Substances Act 1993 (RSA93) deals with the control of radioactive material and disposal of radioactive waste in the United Kingdom.

On 6 April 2010 the Environmental Permitting (England and Wales) Regulations
2010 came into force. These new regulations repeal, amend and replace much of Radioactive Substances Act 1993 in England and Wales.

See also
 Ionising Radiations Regulations 1999

References 

1993 in British law
United Kingdom Acts of Parliament 1993